Baffi is an Italian surname. Notable people with the surname include:

Adriano Baffi (born 1962), Italian cyclist
Marco Baffi (1964), Italian decathlete
Paolo Baffi (1911–1989), Italian academic, banker and economist
Pierino Baffi (1930–1985), Italian cyclist

Italian-language surnames